Margus Tsahkna (born 13 April 1977) is an Estonian politician, one of the leaders of new liberal Estonia 200 party, former leader of the conservative Isamaa party, former Minister of Defence in Jüri Ratas' cabinet and Minister of Social Protection in Taavi Rõivas' second cabinet.

Early life
Tsahkna was born in Tartu, Estonia. After graduating high school in Tartu in 1995, he studied theology and law at the University of Tartu, from 1996 to 2002 and international law at the University of Toronto, from 1999 to 2000.

Political career
In 2000, he joined the "Pro Patria" party. From 2001 to 2004 he was chairman of "Noor-Isamaa", the party's youth organisation. From 2001 to 2003 he was a member of Tartu city council. From 2003 to 2006 he was the party's political secretary. After the affiliation of the "Pro Patria" and "Res Publica" parties, to form the "Pro Patria ja Res Publica Liit" party, he was secretary general from 2007 to 2010, and political secretary from 2010 to 2013. In 2013 he became assistant chairman. He has been a member of the Estonian parliament since 2007, the member of the parliaments finance committee and social committee. He has also acted as a chairman of the parliaments social committee from 2011-2014.

In 2000, he founded the Christian Adolescent Home in Tartu.

He is a member of the General Johan Laidoner Society and of the Korp! Sakala student society.

In 2009, he won second place in the Estonian television singing competition Laulud tähtedega ("Singing with Stars"). He sang with Birgit Õigemeel, winner of the Eesti otsib superstaari.

In 2015 parliamentary election, Tsahkna was re-elected to the parliament with 2,267 individual votes. He was chosen the chairman of the Pro Patria and Res Publica Union on 6 June 2015.

In April 2017, Tsahkna announced that he would not seek re-election as chairman. He was followed by Helir-Valdor Seeder on 13 May 2017. Tsahkna left the party on 26 June 2017. In 2018 he left Isamaa and joined Estonia 200.

Personal life
Tsahkna speaks Estonian, English and Russian. He is married and has four children.

References

1977 births
21st-century Estonian politicians
Defence Ministers of Estonia
Estonia 200 politicians
Government ministers of Estonia
Isamaa politicians
Leaders of political parties in Estonia
Living people
Members of the Riigikogu, 2007–2011
Members of the Riigikogu, 2011–2015
Members of the Riigikogu, 2015–2019
Members of the Riigikogu, 2023–2027
Politicians from Tartu
Pro Patria Union politicians